Frank Felice (born October 13, 1961 in Great Falls, Montana) is an American composer of contemporary classical music and associate professor of composition, theory, and electronic music in the Jordan College of Arts at Butler University.

Background
Felice grew up in Hamilton, Montana, playing piano, guitar, and double bass in a variety of settings, including several rock bands.

He attended Concordia College (Moorhead), the University of Colorado, and Butler University. Felice received his PhD from the University of Minnesota in 1998.

Felice has studied composition under Dominick Argento, Judith Lang Zaimont, Luiz Gonzalez, James Day, Michael Schelle, and Daniel Breedon. He describes himself as "an eclectic composer who writes with a postmodern mischievousness: pieces can be comedic/ironic, simple/complex, or humble/reverent."

He is member of the Society for Electro-Acoustic Music in the United States, the American Composers Forum, the American Music Center, The Society of Composers Inc., and the Christian Fellowship of Art Music Composers.

Activities and collaborations

Performances and commissions
Felice's music has been performed in the U.S., Brazil, Argentina, Japan, Greece, Italy, the United Kingdom, Russia, Austria, the Philippines, the Czech Republic, and Hungary.

Commissions have come with funding from the National Endowment for the Arts, the Omaha Symphony, the Indiana Arts Commission, The Indiana Repertory Theatre, Butler University, Dance Kaleidoscope, the Butler University Arts Festival, Music Teachers National Association, the Wyoming State Arts Board, the Indianapolis Youth Symphony, Kappa Kappa Psi/Tau Beta Sigma, any many private sources. He also serves as an adjudicator and judge for a variety of composition contests each year, throughout the United States, as well as lecturing around the Midwest on new music.

Felice directs the annual Electronic Music Festival, which has taken place at Butler University since 2002. Many of his electronic compositions were recorded on Sidewalk Music: Electronic and Electro-Acoustic Music.

Philosophy
Felice compares composing music to cooking, another of his passions. He says that both involve problem-solving. "It's how you put the ingredients together. Are they going to work?" Of the creative process, Felice says, "Everyone who writes, everyone who composes really is involved with some creation. We echo a little bit of what God did in the very beginning."

Felice inspires his students to be creative and explore their boundaries. He "inspires student composers at Butler University every day to follow through with unique music composition concepts." "Felice's philosophy lends itself nicely to his career as a music educator. Rejecting the Romantic notion of artistic genius, he asserts that, for him, composing is more about form and craft than inspiration and epiphany."

Composer-in-residence
Felice has served as composer-in-residence with the Symphony of Southeast Texas and Eastern Wyoming College.

Dance music
Felice has been commissioned twice to write pieces for Dance Kaleidoscope. "Earthworks" (2005) is a suite of electronic music, choreographed by David Hochoy, and performed as part of The Four Elements. "It is a piece that is rich in texture and sonorities and was actually a challenge to choreograph to when I first heard it. It contains some beautifully evocative sections where the combinations of electronic and classical instruments provide a powerful backdrop for the dancers as they create many different landscapes and scenarios." "Of Rivals and Lovers: Ten Lines from a Poet's Past" was written for Dance Kaleidoscope's Remembrance of Things Past performance in 2012.

Another commission was by the Butler University Department of Dance for a ballet entitled The Willow Maiden, which premiered in 2003. Originally, his ballet was to tell the story of Beren and Lúthien, from J. R. R. Tolkien's The Lord of the Rings. After permission from the Tolkien Estate could not be obtained, Ellen Denham wrote a new story, with new mythological elements, to some of Felice's existing music, and The Willow Maiden was successfully premiered in April, 2003.

Compositions

Orchestral
 Time and Motion (2014)
 Third Suite from The Willow Maiden (2004)
 Entrata! (2002), co-written with Michael Schelle
 The Willow Maiden (2002), ballet
 Three Dances from Romeo & Juliet (1999), chamber orchestra
 Concerto Grosso for Homemade Instruments (1997), for orchestra and homemade instruments
 Crack the Whip! (1992)
 Pre-Sleep Mental Dances (1992), soprano and orchestra
 Adagio (1988)
 Ainúlindalë (1985), symphonic poem
 Nocturne (1985), cello and chamber orchestra

Symphonic band / wind ensemble
 Power Plays (2013)
 Revolution Calling (2013), brass, percussion, and four-channel fixed media
 Three Fanfares (2007)
 Fanfare and Dances from the Court of the Woodland King (2004)
 Sleight of Band (2000)
 Passage (1997)
 Antics (Pagliacciata) (1996)

Mixed chamber ensembles
 Exquisite Corpse (fragment) (2010), three unspecified soloists
 le cadaver exquis boira le vin nouveau (2010), three unspecified soloists and piano
 Michael Schelle, ein Porträt (2010), speaker, two percussionists, and piano
 Morning becomes.... (2009), clarinet and cello
 you drive ME nervous.... (2009), flute, horn in F, violin, bass, and percussion
 Charismata (2007), clarinet, alto saxophone, cello, percussion
 Pasta Concerns: Three Lead Sheets (2006), flexible instrumentation
 arcana (2003), flute/alto flute, violin, cello, piano

Choral
 James Whitcomb Riley Triptych (2014), SSAATTBB
 Nearly Madrigals (2012), SATB
 Voice of the Mountains (2012), SATB and piano
 Heiligenstadt, Oct. 6, 1802 (2011), SSAATTBB
 A Pocket Breviary (2011), SSAATTBB and organ
 Bitterroot Homecoming (2006), SATB
 The Word Made Flesh (2004), a round in four or more parts
 ...in the Melting (2002), SSAATB and clarinet
 Four Christmas Tableaux (2000), SATB and concert band
 Critical Mass (1995-1998), concert mass
 Canticle of Mary (1994), soprano solo and SATB
 My Daughter (1993), SSA and english horn
 Three Autumn Portraits (1990), SATB
 What is Beauty But a Breath? (1984), SATB

Vocal solo and duo
 If Ever Two Were One (2008), high voice and string quartet
 Letters to Derrick (1995), song cycle for medium voice and piano
 Pre-Sleep Mental Dances (1992), song cycle for high voice and piano or orchestra
 Four Songs of Jennifer Haines (1989), song cycle for medium voice and piano

Keyboard
 Shichi mata ha (2010), piano solo
 Echolocator (2009, rev. 2010), piano solo
 awakenings (winter) (2008), piano solo for either the left or right hand alone
 three pieces from banff (2006), piano solo
 Rapping Papers (2002), piano solo
 Preludes (1998), piano solo
 Odds and Entities (1992–present), piano solo
 Piano Sonata No. 1 (1991)
 Scherzophrenia (1984), piano solo

Woodwind solo/ensemble
 The Empty Sky (2011), oboe solo
 Walkin' by Myself (2011), bassoon solo
 Jumping the Shark (2005), clarinet and wind ensemble
 The Wedding at Cana (2004), two flutes
 "...and so the hole was dug" (2001), bassoon and stereo recorded medium
 Fifteen Pieces About Kim Ellis (1999), clarinet solo with mezzo soprano and percussion obbligato
 Catechism, Criticism, and Wit (1993), saxophone and an unspecified number of performers
 Playground of the Winds (1993), woodwind quintet
 "...a chasing after the wind" (1992), alto flute and piano

Brass solo/ensemble
 Honk! (2014), horn and piano
 Waiting for Gounod (2004), euphonium and nine string instruments
 Phantoms (1984), trombone/piano duet
 Troll's March (1983), brass quintet

String solo/ensemble
 Five Whimsies for Non-Grownups (2010), string quartet
 Seven by Three (2009), three e-bowed electric guitars
 Reflection on a Hymn of Thanksgiving (2004), two violins
 Two by Four (2004), three violins and viola
 BRACE YOURSELF LIKE A MAN (2001), solo violin and recorded medium
 Were You Angry with the Rivers (2001), solo double bass
 String Quartet No. 4 (1993)
 Quarks (1991), solo violin
 String Quartet No. 3 (1988)
 String Quartet No. 2 (1986)
 Simple Suite (1984), cello solo
 String Quartet No. 1 (1984)

Percussion
 Chalk Circle Reel (2009), marimba solo
 now I know in part (2007), violin, cello, and marimba
 Road to Damascus (2006), one player on marimba and assorted percussion
 Basta! (1996), marimba solo
 Up the Creek! (1992), an unspecified amount of performers and a floor that creaks

Electronic
 ...of glass (2009)
 Earthworks (2005)
 Postlude: Past the Purge Tents (2001)
 Prelude: Purge the Past Tense (2001)
 Psychotica: Six Etudes for the Very, Very Nervous (2001)
 Retrogressions (I, II, III) (2001)
 Sidewalk Music (2001)
 Reflections from The Night Attic (1999)
 When Two or More Are Gathered (2001)

Incidental music
 Of Lovers and Rivals (Ten Lines from a Poet's Past) (also known as Remembrance of Things Past) (2012), fixed media
 The Caucasian Chalk Circle (2009), six songs for mezzo soprano, two baritones, marimba, and percussion
 The Lamentations Project (2007), treble women's chorus and recorded medium
 The Turn of the Screw (2003), solo piano with electronic processing, sound effects, and recorded medium
 Metamorphosis (2001), clarinet/bass clarinet, violin/guitar, cello, keyboards, percussion
 Romeo & Juliet (1999), chamber orchestra, three percussionists, two harps, piano/celeste, and strings

References

External links
Frank Felice, composer
School of Music, Butler University

American male composers
21st-century American composers
University of Minnesota alumni
University of Colorado alumni
Living people
Butler University alumni
Concordia College (Moorhead, Minnesota) alumni
1961 births
21st-century American male musicians